The 9th Annual Streamy Awards was the ninth installment of the Streamy Awards honoring the best in American streaming television series and their creators. The awards was split into three sections with different themes: the main Streamy Awards, the second annual Streamys Brand Awards, and the Third Annual Streamys Purpose Awards. The main ceremony was streamed live on YouTube from The Beverly Hilton in Beverly Hills, California on December 13, 2019. It was the first Streamy Awards ceremony to run without a host, instead featuring segments from online content creators to highlight the diversity of the industry. The show also highlighted international creators with the addition of multiple international categories and added a new Technology category.

On September 11, 2019, the 2nd annual Streamys Brand Awards were held during the IAB Digital Content NewFronts West at NeueHouse Hollywood and hosted by Emile Ennis Jr. The awards honored innovation in brand advertising. On December 9, 2019, the 2nd annual Purpose Awards @ The Streamys were held at the YouTube Space LA, hosted by Jay Shetty. The awards recognized digital creators, brands, and nonprofits who have used their influence for a greater good.

Performers 
The 9th Streamy Awards featured musical performances from Normani and Kim Petras. Petras' performance was introduced by Paris Hilton. The Streamy Purpose Awards featured a musical performance by Savannah Outen.

Winners and nominees 

The nominees were announced on October 16, 2019. 23 of the awards were announced on December 11 at the Streamy Premiere Awards in Santa Monica, hosted by Niki and Gabi. The remaining awards were announced at the main ceremony at The Beverly Hilton on December 13, 2019. Winners of the categories were selected by the Streamys Blue Ribbon Panel except for the Audience Choice awards which were put to a public vote.

Winners are listed first, in bold.

Brand Awards 
The second annual Streamys Brand Awards were presented at a separate event hosted by Emile Ennis Jr. at NeueHouse Hollywood on September 11, 2019 during the IAB Digital Content NewFronts West. Winners are listed first, in bold.

Purpose Awards 

The third annual Purpose Awards were presented at a separate event hosted by Jay Shetty at the YouTube Space LA on December 9, 2019. They featured a performance by Savannah Outen of her song "The Hard Way" and an appearance from special guests Sam and Colby. Purpose Award honorees are listed in bold.

Reception 
Tana Mongeau winning the Audience Choice Award for Creator of the Year proved controversial and was criticized by other creators such as Keemstar, Jake and Logan Paul, and PewDiePie, with many believing that the award should have gone to YouTuber MrBeast who had raised $20 million to plant trees through his Team Trees initiative that year.

References 

Streamy Awards
Streamy Awards
Streamy Awards
2019 in Internet culture